Sahbit Raey (English: A Woman's Opinion) is the twelfth studio album by Lebanese recording artist Elissa, released on 1 August 2020 by Rotana. Following her 2018 album Ila Kol Lli Bihibbouni, the album contains 18 tracks and was preceded by the release of three singles, including the lead single of the same name on 23 July 2020.

In the album's physical booklet, Elissa wrote that Sahbit Raey is to be her final album released by Saudi-based group Rotana, marking her departure from the label since signing in 2004. As a result, Rotana released a three-disc special box set CD featuring the album on the first disc, and twenty singles from her last eight albums split across the latter two.

Background 
In 2019, Elissa had announced on social media that recording sessions for her twelfth studio album had begun. However on 19 August, she posted on Twitter announcing her retirement; calling the Arab music industry "similar to the mafias" and that her then-upcoming album would be her last. Many fans and peers of Elissa reacted by sending support and paying tribute to her, along with trending hashtags such as "We Are All Elissa" (#كلنااليسا) as well as her name. Throughout late-2019 and early-2020, Elissa teased fans with new music by posting pictures of her and producers in studio; announcing titles of songs such as "Ala Hess Hikayetna" and "Habbit Ehtimam".

Release 

On 11 April 2020, Elissa and Rotana released the single "Hanghanni Kaman W Kaman" on streaming platforms. On the same day, a music video directed by Eli Rezkallah was published to Rotana's YouTube channel. As of December 2020, the music video has amassed over 10 million views. On 25 May, she released another single titled "Ahwit El Madi" and published a lyric video on YouTube on the same day.

In June, Elissa disclosed on a social media post that her album would be released on the day of Eid al-Adha. On 20 July, she announced the name of her album titled Sahbit Raey as well as the lead single of the same name, which was released three days later. The album was released exclusively on Deezer and other streaming platforms a week later. Upon unveiling the album's title and cover, Elissa stated on the aforementioned social media post saying:

Track listing

Personnel 
Adapted from the album liner notes.

 Jean Nakhoul - executive producer
 Elie Barbar - sound engineer, mixing (tracks 1, 2, 3, 5, 6, 7, 8, 10, 11, 12, 13, 14), mastering (track 11)
 Ledes Díaz - backing vocals (track 2)
 Sherif Fahmi - guitar (track 2)
 Ledos Diaz - Spanish vocals (track 2)
 Mohamed Sika - bass guitar (tracks 3, 6, 10)
 Hamuso - clarinet (track 3)
 Mostafa Aslan - guitar (tracks 3, 5, 6, 10)
 Tamer Ghoneim - leader (tracks 3, 6, 10)
 Mohammed Ads - recording (tracks 3, 5, 6, 10)
 Alain Oueijan - guitar (track 4)
 Mostafa Nasr - guitar (tracks 4, 7, 8, 9, 14, 15)
 Edouard Meunier - mixing (tracks 4, 9, 15, 17, 18)
 Ihab Jamal - strings (tracks 4, 9, 15)
 Ahmed Ragab - bass guitar (track 5)
 Said Kamal - strings (track 5)
 Ahmad Ibrahim - strings (tracks 6, 10, 11)
 Hasan Said - strings (tracks 7, 8, 13, 14)
 Ammar Khater - recording (tracks 8, 13, 14)
 Wael Najjar - accordion (track 11)
 Oussama Hasan - bouzouki (track 11)
 Ahmad Hussein - guitar (track 11)
 Ahmad Rocket - guitar (track 13)
 Nadim Rouhana - accordion (track 15)
 Sam Amelian - saxophone (track 15)
 Amir Mahrous - mixing (track 16)
 John Davis - digital mastering
 Eli Rezkallah - photographer
 Mandy Merheb - fashion consultant
 Bassam Fattouh - make up
 Yehya Chokr - hair

References 

Elissa (singer) albums
Rotana Records albums
2020 albums